The Leeds Festival, officially known as the Leeds Triennial Musical Festival, was a classical music festival which took place between 1858 and 1985 in Leeds, West Yorkshire, England.

History 
The first festival celebrated the opening of Leeds Town Hall by Queen Victoria on 7 September 1858. A second festival was held in 1874, then it was held every three years until 1970. For the two festivals in the 1870s, Sir Michael Costa was principal conductor.  For the next seven festivals, until 1898, the principal conductor was Sir Arthur Sullivan. King George V was the festival's patron in 1922;  his daughter, The Princess Royal, sister of King George VI, and her husband also became patrons in anticipation  of their wedding in 1922. From the 1920s, Princess Mary had attended the opening nights and many of the festival's performances, and later, with her son, George Lascelles, 7th Earl of Harewood, and his wife, the Countess of Harewood, née Marion Stein, a former concert pianist. Lascelles was a noted music critic whose career included the role of artistic director of the Leeds Triennial Musical Festival (1958–74).

In April 1953, members of the public were for the first time told by the festival's chairman, Sir George Martin, that they may not be permitted to attend the rehearsals of some of the performances. In 1949, Sir George, an ex-Lord Mayor of Leeds (1947), had been president of the Leeds Chamber of Commerce. Leeds woollen manufacturer and solicitor, Mr R. Noel Middleton, was a member of the Executive Committee of the  Festival and, in 1937, 1947 and 1950, he  was chairman of the Programme Committee. Middleton  was  also   chairman  of the  Northern  Philharmonic Orchestra, of which the Princess Royal was patron. The Northern Philharmonic Orchestra  first played  at the  Leeds  Festival in 1937.

Dissolution 
The last Leeds Triennial Musical Festival was held in 1985. The Leeds Festival Chorus, which was founded for the first festival, became independent in 1976, and continues to perform, broadcast and make recordings.

References

Sources

Further reading
  Pages about the history of the chorus from 1858 to today, previously published as a booklet Celebrate 2008 to commemorate the 150th anniversary of Leeds Town Hall and the chorus.
 List of oratorios

1858 establishments in England
1985 disestablishments in England
Classical music festivals in England
Music festivals established in 1858
Music festivals in Leeds
Recurring events disestablished in 1985